Rhythm is a 2000 Indian Tamil-language musical drama film written and directed by Vasanth and produced by V. Natarajan. The film stars Arjun and Meena in lead role  with Jyothika, Ramesh Aravind,  Lakshmi, Nagesh, and Manivannan in important roles. The music was composed by A. R. Rahman, while cinematography was predominantly handled by P. S. Vinod, and Sreekar Prasad edited the film. The film was released on 15 September 2000, receiving positive reviews from critics.

Plot
Karthikeyan (Arjun) is a photographer-editor working in Indian Express in Bombay. Chitra (Meena) is a bank employee. Both reside in Navi Mumbai. Karthik meets Chitra while opening a bank account. While returning home, he again meets her in a train. He offers his seat, but she does not want to accept it. During a train strike, he invites her to travel in an auto to reduce expenses, but she declines. When Chitra hesitated to travel in the same train with Karthik, he becomes exasperated and explains that he only talked to her because both are from the same locality, both are Tamilians, and he promises her that he will never talk to her again. After some days Chitra voluntarily talks to him. Karthik, in return, accompanies her to a police station to get back her snatched handbag. Karthik invites Chitra to his home to meet his parents.

Karthik's parents like Chitra and all become friends. Weeks later, Karthik's mother requests Chitra to tell Karthik to get married. When she conveys his parents' wish, Karthik explains about his late wife Aruna (Jyothika). Eight years earlier Karthik was a police officer with the bomb defusing squad. Though Aruna did not want Karthik to endanger his life every now and then, she does not tell him to quit, due to her respect of his desire to work as defuser. While Karthik and Aruna are in Tirupur to attend Aruna's friend's marriage, Karthik is pulled to Coimbatore to defuse a bomb, and he accomplishes. But Karthik's colleague and friend Ajay loses a leg in another defusion work. Karthik goes to Chennai to meet Ajay, who tells him about Aruna's fears. Karthik quits from Bomb squad and informs Aruna. Aruna, in a bid to soon meet Karthik, leaves to Chennai by train. Due to a signalling error, her train collides head on with another train and she passes away. Karthik then quit the police job and moved to Mumbai .

Chitra then tells Karthik about her life. She was a graduate in Chennai living with her brother's family and searching for a job. She meets SBI officer Srikanth (Ramesh Aravind) through various accidental events, and they fall in love. While Chitra's family do not object to the marriage, Srikanth's Brahmin parents in Ooty object to the marriage. Srikanth disobeys them and marries Chitra. Within hours of the marriage, Srikanth receives news that his mom is on death bed. When he goes to Ooty, he finds that his dad lied to him, and his mother banishes him forever. Distraught, he leaves to Chennai by train, and died in the same train accident as Aruna. As per her husband's earlier wish, Chitra adopts a baby boy, Shiva. Her brother got a good job offer in Singapore and Chitra forced them to leave her. She got Srikanth's job from the bank due to his untimely demise and thus she had moved ahead. Knowing all this, Karthik's parents want them to get married.

Shiva moves close to Karthik and his family, while Chitra tries to prevent relations with Karthik. Karthik's father (Nagesh) understands Karthik's interest towards Chitra. He asks her to marry Karthik. She refuses, and once for all, avoids Karthik. Karthik understood her intention and stayed away from her. Chitra meanwhile gets confused regarding second marriage due to the trouble given by her neighbour's husband and Shiva's passion for Karthik. Chitra's neighbour once attempts to rape her; she manages to escape. Karthik, who heard about it, attacks the man for misbehaving, and makes him vacate Mumbai.

After much thought, Chitra decides to marry Karthik for herself and her son. She plans to meet him at the station to express her decision. While returning home, she meets her mother-in-law (Lakshmi) waiting for her. Chitra's mother-in-law requests her to come and live with her as she is very alone after her husband's death. Chitra applies for transfer and leaves to Ooty with her mother-in-law. She has not dared to meet Karthik and she leaves without informing him. Karthik and his family are very much disappointed by this.

After some months, Chitra panics on seeing a news about a bomb blast at Mumbai Indian Express and verifies Karthik's safety. Karthik leaves for Coonoor on an official assignment. There he meets Chitra with her mother-in-law in a shopping center. Chitra introduces him to her and tells about Aruna's death in the same train accident where Srikanth died. On hearing this, Chitra's mother-in-law invites Karthik to have lunch with them the next day. This delights Shiva. He eagerly waits for Karthik and leaves school well before, but is stuck in a traffic jam for a long time. Meanwhile, Chitra explains about her decision to marry him, and later changed it as her mother-in-law requested her to live with him.

Karthik leaves without meeting Shiva to catch the train. This disappoints Shiva. When Chitra tried to console him, he blames her because she did not keep the promise that he, Chitra, Karthik, and his parents to live together. Chitra's mother-in-law hears this, understood the meaning of it and she realised the mistake she made. She catches Karthik at the station and requests him to marry Chitra. Karthik and Chitra leave for Mumbai and get married, which delights Shiva and Karthik's parents.

Cast 

 Special appearances

Production

Development 

Originally announced with pre-release stills in websites in 1997, the movie was four years in the making, a fairly long production time in the Indian film industry. Producer Pyramid Natarajan signed Vasanth for the project while he was working on Aasai (1995).

Casting 
Arjun was cast as after another hero backed out. Meena, who was supposed to star in Vasanth's Nee Paadhi Naan Paadhi was cast as the heroine for this film while A. R. Rahman, who was supposed to work in Aasai worked as the music director. For a further lead role of Arjun's wife, Vasanth considered Vindhya and Sanghavi, before finalising Jyothika, the sister of actress Nagma, who was signed on to make her Tamil debut with the film, although Vaali ended up releasing before Rhythm. A. R. Rahman was signed on to compose the music for the film ahead of Vidyasagar, and worked on the project simultaneously with two other productions of Natarajan, Udhaya and Sangamam. P. S. Vinod was selected to make his debut as cinematographer instead of V. Manikandan , while the team also credited Arthur A. Wilson as an additional cinematographer and R. D. Rajasekhar was also given special thanks in the title card. Early reports suggested the film would be inspired by the 1995 Hollywood film, A Walk in the Clouds, but this proved untrue. It was also rumoured that the film would run along the lines of the 1998 film Pooveli, and this had also caused a delay in the making. During the initial stages of shoot, Vasanth considered renaming the film to Poo Pookkum Osai, but later kept the original title.

Filming 
After a 15-day schedule in Bombay, the unit shifted to various locations to picturise a song sequence and the song "Nathiye Nathiye" was shot at the locations of Mysore, the Shivanasamudra dam, and the Thriveni Sangama. The team also shot in South India in Chalakudy and Ooty, before the unit moved North to Haridwar, Badrinath and the Gangotri. Scenes were also shot at Juinagar Station in New Bombay.

The film languished in development hell after shooting was over, with the producers reluctant to notify what was keeping the release delayed. The delay of the film led to Vasanth directing three other films in between Nerukku Ner, Poovellam Kettuppar and Appu, as he waited for the release. At some point due to the long delay in its release, unconfirmed news was circulating that production had been shelved due to financial constraints. Natarajan blamed A. R. Rahman for the delay and it was reported that the producer had not yet settled the payment for Rahman's work in Sangamam, and therefore he was dragging his feet on completing the work for Rhythm. The producer supposedly toyed with the idea of replacing Rahman with another music director in both Rhythm and his other film Udhaya but ran out of money to even complete the shooting of Rhythm. The producer then persuaded Rahman to complete work on the music of Rhythm so that he could make money from music sales and complete the movie.

Release
The film won very positive reviews with The Hindu claiming "Vasanth has created a smooth, flowing timbre, with very little harshness in the line of events that take place", describing it as an "appreciable effort". Indolink.com gave the film a positive review, citing that "Arjun has definitely matured as an actor and as polished as ever as Karthikeyan" and that "a lot of care has gone into Meena's make-up and acting in this film". The critic also praised the performances of the supporting cast, while adding that "Rhythm's actual beauty lies in the hands of its cameramen, Vinod and Arthur Wilson and music director, A. R. Rahman." A reviewer from TMCafe noted the film has "outstanding performances from the lead, brilliant pairing, and a sumptuous story."

Another critic labelled that "Handled better, Rhythm could have turned out to be a must-watch film, though it is still definitely far better than the run-of-the-mill ones", criticizing that the "director seems preoccupied with the so-called commercial ingredients, which only mar the overall impact of the film." The film was also dubbed and released in Telugu under the same title.

Awards 
Rhythm won Shivakumar the Tamil Nadu State Film Award for Best Audiographer, while Meena picked up Best Actress at the Cinema Express Awards and Jyothika won the Best Sensational Actress Award at the same Event along with Khushi.The hit pair Arjun and Jyothika was also Nominated at the Cinema Express Award for best Onscreen pair, which was lost to Prashanth - Simran Pair.

Soundtrack

The soundtrack of film features five songs composed by A. R. Rahman, with lyrics by Vairamuthu. The song titles and lyrics were inspired by the five elements wind, water, fire, sky and Earth. A. R. Rahman used the verse "Dheem Thana Na" as the pallavi (thematic line) in "Nadhiye Nadhiye" after Vasanth told Rahman that he liked that line. Three songs were later reused in the Bollywood movie Lakeer – Forbidden Lines. The song Thaniye gained popularity and Shankar Mahadevan sang this song in the Super Singer Episode in Star Vijay.

Telugu (Dubbed)

References

External links
 

2000 films
Films about widowhood in India
Films shot in Mumbai
2000 romantic drama films
Films directed by Vasanth
2000s Tamil-language films
Films scored by A. R. Rahman
Films shot in Chalakudy
Films shot in Ooty
Films shot in Mysore
Indian romantic drama films
Films shot in Thrissur